Shixia may refer to:

Shixia culture, a Neolithic culture after an archaeological site in Maba, Qujiang District, Shaoguan, Guangdong, China

Places in China
Shixia, Gansu (石峡镇), a town in Xihe County, Gansu
Shixia Township, Jiangxi (石峡乡), a township in Zixi County, Jiangxi
Shixia Township, Shanxi (石匣乡), a township in Zuoquan County, Shanxi

See also
Shixia Station (石厦站), a metro station in Shenzhen, Guangdong